Cynthia G. Franklin is a contemporary American literary and cultural critic.  She is a professor in the English department at the University of Hawaii at Manoa.

Education and career 
Franklin got her Bachelor of Arts from Stanford University and her MA and PhD from University of California at Berkeley.

Franklin teaches at the University of Hawaii at Manoa.

In two books and a series of articles, Franklin has paid special attention to life-writing, directing attention to overlooked subgenres such as the academic memoir and "collective" life-writing. As co-editor of the journal Biography, she plays a key role in shaping global scholarship on life-writing. Two special issues—Personal Effects and Translating Lives—she co-curated for Biography, indicate this role. Through these special issues she has driven scholarly recognition of life-writing as a political as well as global genre.

Franklin's book-length latest work is Academic Lives: Memoir, Cultural Theory and the University Today (University of Georgia Press, 2009). This book is a trenchant and wide-ranging critique of strands of contemporary cultural theory—feminist, post-colonial, disability studies and critical race studies amongst others. By scrutinizing memoirs written by such influential fellow critics as Edward Said and Jane Tompkins, Franklin throws startling light on ignored aspects of academic culture. Franklin's previous book Writing Women's Communities: The Politics and Poetics of Contemporary Multi-Genre Anthologies (University of Wisconsin Press, 1997) shows how feminist writers of the 70s and 80s pioneered the anthology as a unique form of narrating women's lives.

References

External links
 https://archive.today/20130416013453/http://www.ugapress.org/index.php/books/academic_lives
 http://uwpress.wisc.edu/books/0178.htm

Living people
Year of birth missing (living people)
Stanford University alumni
University of California, Berkeley alumni
University of Hawaiʻi faculty